Margherita Magnani (born 26 February 1987) is an Italian middle-distance runner.

Biography
2013 was the year of her statement, also at international level. Margherita Magnani won one time Italian Athletics Indoor Championships (2013) and her personal best on 1500 metres (4:06.34) is the 9th best berfomance of all-time in Italy, and 38th best world performance in the 2013. She in 2013 also participated at the European Indoor Championships, the European Team Championships and Mediterranean Games, she has 4 caps in national team from 2012.

Progression
1500 metres

Achievements

National titles
Se won six national championships at individual senior level.

Italian Athletics Championships
1500 metres: 2015, 2016
Italian Athletics Indoor Championships
1500 metres: 2013, 2014, 2108
3000 metres: 2018

See also
 Italian all-time top lists - 1500 m

References

External links
 

1987 births
Athletics competitors of Fiamme Gialle
Italian female middle-distance runners
Living people
World Athletics Championships athletes for Italy
Athletes (track and field) at the 2016 Summer Olympics
Olympic athletes of Italy
Universiade medalists in athletics (track and field)
People from Cesena
Universiade bronze medalists for Italy
Medalists at the 2013 Summer Universiade
Athletes (track and field) at the 2013 Mediterranean Games
Mediterranean Games competitors for Italy
Sportspeople from the Province of Forlì-Cesena